Madiya or Maria is a Dravidian language spoken in India. It may be regarded as a dialect of Gondi, but is suspected to be mutually unintelligible with most other Gondi varieties.

Phonology 
Phonology of Abhuj Maria:

Hill Maria has 3 additional consonants: a glottal stop /ʔ/, a retroflex nasal /ɳ/, and a uvular fricative /ʁ/.

In 2019, a former professor published the first book in the Madiya language.

References

Agglutinative languages
Dravidian languages
Languages of India

sv:Gond#Dialekter